Henry Fowler (1799 - ?) was a farmer and local politician who served as a member of both the Maryland House of Delegates and the Wisconsin State Assembly during terms ranging from 1834 to 1872.

Biography
Fowler was born on September 9, 1799 in St. Mary's County, Maryland. He later settled in the Town of Milwaukee in Milwaukee County, Wisconsin and was a farmer by trade.

Political career
Fowler was a member of the House of Delegates for St. Mary's County from 1834 to 1836 and was also a member of the St. Mary's County Board of Commissioners. He would serve in the Wisconsin Assembly during the 1865, 1867 and 1872 sessions. Other positions Fowler held included member of the town board of supervisors (similar to city council) of the Town of Milwaukee, and of the county board of supervisors of Milwaukee County. He was a Democrat.

He does not seem to be connected to the Henry J. Fowler who would serve as a Democratic member of the House of Delegates from St. Mary's County from 1951-1970.

References

People from St. Mary's County, Maryland
People from Milwaukee County, Wisconsin
Democratic Party members of the Maryland House of Delegates
Democratic Party members of the Wisconsin State Assembly
Wisconsin city council members
County commissioners in Maryland
County supervisors in Wisconsin
American justices of the peace
Farmers from Wisconsin
1799 births
Year of death missing